The 2013–14 South American Beach Volleyball Circuit was a South American beach volleyball tour. The tour consisted of nine tournaments in both genders.

The tournament was in the 2013 calendar, however the first tournament begin in January 2014.

Tournaments
  Macaé Tournament, Brazil, January 24–26
  Viña Tournament, Viña del Mar, Chile, February 7–9
  Montevideo Tournament, Montevideo, Uruguay, February 14–16
  Trilce Tournament, Lima, Peru, February 28 – March 2
  Sucre Tournament, Sucre, Bolivia, March 21–23
  Cochabamba Tournament, Cochabamba, Bolivia, March 28–30
  Tucuman Tournament, Tucuman, Argentina, April 11–13
  Vargas Tournament, Caracas, Venezuela, May 20–23
  Gutape Tournament, Cali, Colombia, May 30 – June 1
  Asunción Tournament, Asunción, Paraguay, June 6–8

References

External links
 CSV Homepage

South America
 
South American Beach Volleyball Championships